Hands up is a colloquial name for the human (or primate) gesture of surrender.

As a proper noun, Hands Up may refer to:

Film and TV
 Hands Up (serial), a 1918 film serial, directed by Louis J. Gasnier and James W. Horne
 Hands Up! (1917 film), directed by Tod Browning
 Hands Up (1921 film), a 1921 German silent film
 Hands Up! (1926 film), directed by Clarence G. Badger
 Hands Up! (1981 film) Rece do góry, a Polish film
 Hands Up! (2000 film), a Telugu film
 Hands Up! (1999), a short film starring Timothy Spall
 Hands Up! (2003 film), a Chinese film
 Danish and Norwegian titles of The Good Bad-Man, a 1916 Western starring Douglas Fairbanks
 Swedish title of The Frontiersmen, a 1938 Hopalong Cassidy Western
 Swedish title of Land of the Open Range (1942), a Western

Music
 Hands up, a subgenre of Eurodance electronic dance music
 Ruki Vverh!, or Hands Up, a Russian pop music group

Albums
 Hands Up (album), a 2011 album by 2PM, or the title song

Songs
 "Hands Up" (Cherry Bullet song), 2020
 "Hands Up" (Hype song), 1995
 "Hands Up" (Lloyd Banks song), 2006
 "Hands Up" (TLC song), 2003
 "Hands Up" (Merk & Kremont song), 2018
 "Hands Up", by Army of Lovers from Le Grand Docu-Soap, 2001
 "Hands Up", by Groove Armada from Soundboy Rock, 2007
 "Hands Up", by September from Love CPR, 2011
 "Hands Up", by Romanian singer Inna from Nirvana, 2017
 "Hands Up (My Last)", by Lil Wayne from Sorry 4 the Wait, 2011
 "Hands Up (4 Lovers)", 1993 song by Right Said Fred from their album Sex and Travel
 "Hands Up (Give Me Your Heart)", by the disco duo Ottawan, 1981
 "Hands Up (Wink Wink)", 2016 song by Reks from his album The Greatest X

Other
 Hands up, don't shoot, or simply "hands up", a slogan and gesture inspired by the shooting of Michael Brown

See also
 Hands up punishment, a form of punishment in schools in India
 List of gestures#Two handed